The Mangochi District is a hub of commerce. It is a transit point, with roads leading to all areas of Malawi and Mozambique to the east. In fact, the border is not far once you cross the Shire River. To the north, the road bifurcates into the Salima or Monkey Bay roads. To the west, is the hilly region of Dedza. Traveling south, the road climbs up the Machinga escarpment to Zomba, the former colonial capital of Nyasaland, and from there to Malawi's commercial hub of Blantyre (named after David Livingstone's home town near Glasgow). It is fiercely hot in summer and ambient in winter. It is on the flood-plain for Lake Malawi (formerly Lake Nyassa). The lake is the third largest and most southerly in the Rift Valley lake system (the others being Lake Victoria and Lake Tanganyika), and is unofficially known as the Lake of Stars. The lake was named by David Livingston as he discovered it on September 18, 1859, for the effect of the reflection of the sun on the water's surface.

While a beautiful area, the Mangochi area has been decimated by Africa's nemesis - AIDS. Couple that with poverty, climate change and a severe lack of infrastructure and the scenario is desperate. It is a very beautiful place, full of natural minerals, loads of fish, for example chambo, and of course Nkopola Lodge, Sun and Sand Palm Beach and many more.  In fact there are numerous lovely lodges along the Mangochi Road other than Nkopola Lodge. One of the finest is Club Makokola (Club Mac).  There are beautiful tropical fish, mostly cichlids, to be seen while swimming. There are also many fabulous bird rookeries along the lake with fish eagles, the national bird of Malawi, a member of the same genus as the American bald eagle. Mangochi is well known with its lake that generates income in the tourism industry. Most of the indigenous people of Mangochi are the Yao people, and there are a few from other tribes. Lingamasa is known with its fresh rice that is sold in most parts of the country.

Demographics
At the time of the 2018 Census of Malawi, the distribution of the population of Mangochi District by ethnic group was as follows:
 72.3% Yao
 9.5% Lomwe
 8.0% Chewa
 4.2% Ngoni
 3.1% Nyanja
 0.9% Tumbuka
 0.6% Sena
 0.6% Mang'anja
 0.5% Tonga
 0.0% Nkhonde
 0.0% Lambya
 0.0% Sukwa
 0.2% Others

Government and administrative divisions

There are thirteen National Assembly constituencies in Mangochi:

 Mangochi - Central
 Mangochi - East
 Mangochi - Lutende
 Mangochi - Malombe
 Mangochi - Monkey Bay
 Mangochi - Nkungulu
 Mangochi - North
 Mangochi - North East
 Mangochi - South
 Mangochi - South West

Since the 2009 general election most of these constituencies (except Mangochi Monkey Bay, which has been held by members of the Democratic Progressive Party) have been represented by politicians from the United Democratic Front.

References

 
Districts of Malawi
Districts in Southern Region, Malawi